At least five ships in the Imperial Russian, Soviet or Russian Navies have been named Varyag after the Varangian people, the Viking ancestors of the Rus.

 - A steam corvette scrapped in 1886.
She is most noted for her heroic attack during the Battle of Chemulpo Bay.
 - A  missile cruiser completed in 1965, and decommissioned in 1990.
 - A  missile cruiser launched in 1983 as Chervona Ukrayina, completed in 1989, renamed Varyag and operating in the Pacific since 1990. Flagship of the Pacific Fleet

Russian Navy ship names